The "angry white man" or "angry white male" is a cultural stereotype of white men holding conservative or right-wing views in the context of U.S. and Australian politics, often characterized by "opposition to liberal anti-discriminatory policies" and beliefs. The term is usually applied to white men from the United States and Australia. In the United States, the greatest perceived threat to white male dominance has been advances of white women and people of color following the women's liberation movement and Civil Rights movement of the 1960s and 1970s, in addition to immigration, multiculturalism and LGBT rights.

United States 
The term commonly refers to a political voting bloc which emerged in the early 1990s as a reaction to perceived injustices faced by white men in the face of affirmative action quotas in the workplace. Angry white men are characterized as having animosity toward young people, women or minorities, and liberalism in general. Donald Trump's male supporters have been described by some political commentators as angry white men.

Australia 
It appeared during Australia's 1998 federal elections. New political parties appeared in that election due to the preexisting fathers' rights movement in Australia. These included the Abolish Family Support/Family Court Party and the Family Law Reform Party. Similar to the usage of the term in the United States, the Australian men categorized as angry white men opposed what they perceived as the feminist agenda. These political parties were created as a reaction to the historic number of women elected to the House of Representatives. Members of these groups claimed that "feminists have entrenched themselves in positions of power and influence in government and are using their power to victimise men".

Senator Eric Abetz from the centre-right Liberal Party, arguing against Section 18C of the Racial Discrimination Act 1975, said in 2016 that it was "passing strange" that the Australian Human Rights Commission does not seem to care about what he perceives as "racist terminology" such as angry white man, but does care if another color is used to describe someone. "One cannot help but think that the term 'white' can only refer to skin colour and therefore [you] are making reference to a skin colour [and] one assumes it must have been on the basis of race that the comment was made", he commented.

In popular culture 
The term is applied to those believed to be opposed to the civil rights movement and second-wave feminism.

The films Joe, Raging Bull, Falling Down, Cobb, God Bless America, Joker, and Clint Eastwood's performances in Dirty Harry and Gran Torino have been described as an exploration of the angry white man. In particular, the protagonist of Falling Down (a divorced, laid-off defense worker who descends via chance and choice into a spiral of increasing rage and violence) was widely reported upon as a representative of the stereotype.

The character Archie Bunker from the TV sitcoms All in the Family and Archie Bunker's Place "turned the angry white male into a cultural icon", according to CBS News. Walter White in the television series Breaking Bad has also been described as an "angry white male".

See also 

 Alt-right
 American Dream
 Angry black woman
 Angry White Men
 Angry young man (South Korea)
 Angry young men (United Kingdom)
 Antisemitism
 Christian nationalism
 Christian privilege
 Criminal stereotype of African Americans
 The fiery Latina and the hot señorita
 Identity politics
 Incel
 Male privilege
 NASCAR dad
 Play the white man
 Right-wing terrorism
 Racism
 Soccer mom
 Stereotypes of white Americans
 Straight privilege
 Systemic bias
 Toxic masculinity
 White backlash
 White nationalism
 White pride
 White privilege
 White supremacy

References 
Citations

Further reading 
 Faludi, Susan (1999) Stiffed: The Betrayal of the American Man. New York: William Morrow and Company, 
 Root, Wayne Allyn (2016) Angry White Male – How the Donald Trump Phenomenon is Changing America — and What We Can All Do to Save the Middle Class. Skyhorse Publishing,

External links 
Angry White Man page in TV Tropes

Alt-right
Antisemitism
Christian fundamentalism
Conservatism in the United States
Conservatism in Australia
Criticism of feminism
Far-right politics
Opposition to affirmative action
Political metaphors referring to people
Male stock characters
Misandry
Pejorative terms for men
Social conservatism
Stereotypes of white men
Stereotypes of white Americans
Stereotypes of working-class men
Terrorism in the United States
White American culture
White nationalism in Australia
Identity politics
Reactionary
Gender studies
Men's studies
Pejorative terms for white people